Hong Kong competed in the Summer Olympic Games for the first time at the 1952 Summer Olympics in Helsinki, Finland.

Four athletes competed for Hong Kong, and a non-participant served as flag-bearer for the Hong Kong delegation at the opening ceremony.

Athletes

 Francisco Xavier Monteiro (1926 Hong Kong-2002)
  Men's 100 m Freestyle -- Final Rank: 52
 Men's 400 m Freestyle 
 1500 m Freestyle
 Cheung Kin Man (1932 Borneo -?)
  Men's 100 m Freestyle -- Final Rank: 23
 Men's 400 m Freestyle
 1500 m Freestyle
 Cynthia Eager (1936 Hong Kong-1996 Keizer, Oregon)
 Women's 100 m Freestyle
 Women's 400 m Freestyle
 Irene Anita Kwok Kam Ngor (born 1933 in Hong Kong)
 Women's 200 m Breaststroke

References

Official Olympic Reports
Hong Kong

Nations at the 1952 Summer Olympics
1952 Summer Olympics
1952 in Hong Kong sport